Maximiliano Guillermo Resquín (born 26 April 1995) is an Argentine professional footballer who plays as a midfielder for Club Atlético Colegiales.

Career
Primera B Metropolitana side Colegiales were Resquín's first senior club. He made his professional bow in April 2013 against Defensores de Belgrano, featuring for the final four minutes of a 1–2 win. Resquín's first goal arrived on 23 August 2015 during a victory away to Deportivo Merlo. After one goal in forty-three matches in his first six seasons, he departed Colegiales at the end of the 2017–18 campaign; which he was selected twenty-five times in and netted two goals. On 30 June 2018, Resquín joined Brown of Primera B Nacional. His first goal came in his third appearance, arriving on 1 September against Olimpo.

Career statistics
.

References

External links

1995 births
Living people
Footballers from Buenos Aires
Argentine footballers
Association football midfielders
Primera B Metropolitana players
Primera Nacional players
Club Atlético Colegiales (Argentina) players
Club Atlético Brown footballers